Lincoln: A Novel is a 1984 historical novel, part of the Narratives of Empire series by Gore Vidal. The novel describes the presidency of Abraham Lincoln and extends from the start of the American Civil War until his assassination. Rather than focus on the Civil War itself, the novel is centred on Lincoln's political and personal struggles. Though Lincoln is the focus, the book is never narrated from his point of view (with the exception of several paragraphs describing a dream Lincoln had shortly before his death); Vidal instead writes from the perspective of key historical figures. He draws from contemporary diaries, memoirs, letters, newspaper accounts, the biographical writings of John Hay and John Nicolay (Lincoln's secretaries), and the work of modern historians.

Plot, Style and Themes

Style 
The novel is part of Gore Vidal’s ‘Narratives of Empire’ series and joins his other works; Burr (1973), 1876 (1976) and Washington D.C. (1967) as chronicles of America. In the series, Vidal offers works of historical fiction that reinterpret American history starting from the American Revolution and spanning past World War II.

The book is never narrated from Lincoln’s perspective. Rather, the reader views Lincoln through the eyes of his enemies, friends, political rivalries and even those who sought to kill him. Significant characters include Lincoln’s cabinet secretaries; William Seward, Salmon Chase as well as Kate Sprague, John Hay, Mary Todd Lincoln and David Herold.

Much of the writing is presented through dramatic, flamboyant dialogue. Vidal favours this over narration or observational writing, attempting to convey his own personal wit and charisma through his characters.

The novel is not simply a work of historical fiction, but with Lincoln's personal and political development it is also a Bildungsroman. Lincoln's development starts with the slow mobilisation and unification of his inner Cabinet, climaxes with his military victory and political restoration of the Union and is completed with his assassination

Plot 
The novel commences on February 23, 1861 as Lincoln, the incumbent president, is traveling to Washington for his inauguration. It is in Washington where a majority of the novel is set. Washington is depicted as turbulent and deteriorating with infestations of pests, poor infrastructure, a Capitol building without a dome, and an incomplete Washington Monument. The novel extends across Lincoln’s two terms of office throughout the American civil war. It offers a detailed and extensive narrative, with the book totaling over 650 pages. It primarily focuses on Lincoln's efforts to unite and mobilize political adversaries and military strategists to ultimately win the war. It is through the various perspectives of other characters that Vidal portrays an ambitious visionary who struggles with an unstable marriage, physical ailments and the failing trust of his fellow cabinet members. The novel also explores Lincoln’s growth as he overcomes these personal and political burdens to ultimately triumph and preserve the union. Vidal completes the novel with President Lincoln’s assassination.

Themes 
The central thematic development is the reinterpretation of the idealistic, sentimental ‘Honest Abe.’ Vidal depicts a politically cunning, dictatorial leader whose primary motivation was not the liberation of African American slaves nor adherence to the Constitution, but the preservation of the Union. Vidal even goes far enough to contend that Lincoln held an unshaken belief of white superiority and was willing to 'bend the Constitution,' although this has been significantly criticised. Vidal believes that it was Lincoln's willingness to act unilaterally and suspend democratic principles such as habeas corpus that allowed him to succeed in his unflinching pursuit of unification. He jailed hostile newspaper editors, political opponents and even employed the Secret Service to inspect private communications.

Vidal follows the complex politics of the cabinet and congress. Initially, Lincoln faces political opponents who constantly doubt and undermine his leadership. Indeed, many of Congressman viewed Lincoln as mild-mannered and weak. However, as the novel progresses, the reader comes to understand that Lincoln purposely and cleverly masks his true emotions. Vidal contends that Lincoln's greatest leadership quality is his introverted nature. Dealing with treacherous politicians, arrogant generals and critics, Lincoln was shrewd and cunning to masterfully navigate the United States to unification as a Republic. Despite the incompetent military strategists and petty, squabbling politicians, Lincoln was aware that his primary goal was to hold the North together for as long as possible. This was because the battle was one of attrition and Lincoln knew that the South's smaller population would be exhausted first.

Ultimately, even Lincoln's political rivalries come to respect his leadership. William Seward, once a fierce opponent and underminer of Lincoln transforms into a devoted servant.

There were also shortcomings of Lincoln. He is depicted as hopelessly naive in dealing with the remarkable costs of financing the war and dealing with the US Treasury. He also struggles as a father. His son, Robert, confides in Hay and reveals that he feels neglected. He comes to resent his father's political ambition that caused him to be so preoccupied and distant. His wife's mood swings and insatiable spending further challenge Lincoln's stoicism, however whilst the marriage is turbulent. the two seem to share a strong bond.

With frequent light-hearted ‘outlandish’ anecdotes and humour, Vidal sought to also explore the human side of Lincoln. Vidal perceived Lincoln's humour as a necessity to dealing with his many great burdens.

Characters

Mary Todd Lincoln 
Lincoln deeply loved his wife and struggled greatly with her mental collapse. She is depicted as a vulnerability in Lincoln's political tactics, frequently clashing with Congressman.

Nonetheless, Vidal's representation of Mary is mostly positive. She is seen as an intelligent and decent person who unfortunately succumbs to fits of insanity characterised by wild mood swings and insatiable spending.

John Hay 
John Hay was Lincoln's personal secretary. He is represented as a close friend and confidant of Lincoln. He was a young man at the time of Lincoln's presidency and was energetic and high-spirited, even through the more challenging times of the war.

William Seward 
Seward was the U.S Secretary of State and is depicted as a handsome, yet politically cunning rival of Lincoln. Initially Seward was a believer that the Southern States should be allowed to pursue their legal right of independence; however, under Lincoln's leadership he came to understand the importance of unification. He was an outspoken member of Lincoln's cabinet, and oversaw the war effort.

Salmon P. Chase 
Chase was Lincoln's Secretary of the U.S Treasury during most of his first term in office, and is depicted as being as interested in developing his candidacy for the 1864 presidential election as he was in his cabinet role. He, like many other politicians, doubted Lincoln's leadership ability, believing that only a more radical abolitionist than Lincoln (someone like Chase himself) would be able to guide the country through its time of great peril. Lincoln shrewdly neutralized Chase's insurgent candidacy for the Republican nomination in 1864 and Chase is left humbled and with limited prospects.

Edwin Stanton 

Edwin Stanton was the U.S. Secretary of War. Known to Lincoln as "Mars," Stanton was tasked with repairing the poor reputation and image of the War Department that was due to his predecessor's mismanagement. He is represented as a large, firm man who often was condescending to others' contribution. He did not have a favorable opinion of Lincoln, but nonetheless worked hard under his command.

David Herold and John Wilkes Booth 
Herold and Booth are the coconspirators who devised and successfully executed a plan to assassinate Lincoln.

Herold despises Lincoln's attempts at unification. He is depicted as unintelligent and frequently engages in debauchery, visiting brothels in Washington. He fantasizes about being a hero of the Confederacy and even poisoning the President through his job as a pharmacy clerk. He eventually finds a group of like-minded individuals who also seek to kill Lincoln, and it is here where he meets Booth.

John Booth is the assassin of Lincoln. Booth is not as incompetent as Herold, but is also a hate-filled enemy of Lincoln. He seeks to avenge the defeat of the South, and stalks Lincoln throughout the novel, swearing revenge. His narrative climaxes with the assassination of Lincoln and subsequent daring escape.

List of Named Characters 
The characters in Lincoln include dozens of historical as well as purely fictional figures. This list of named characters includes those that appear or are mentioned in the novel. They are listed in order of appearance or mention (mentions marked with an *).

Part 1 – Ch 1

 Elihu Washburne – Congressman from Illinois
 *Gautier – DC caterer, rumored to be the lost Dauphin
 William Seward – Senator from NY, Lincoln’s rival for Republican nomination
 Pinkerton – Detective, Lincoln’s bodyguard
 Abraham Lincoln – President elect, then President
 Ward Hill Lamon – Lincoln’s bodyguard, later Constable of DC
 General Winfield Scott – Commander of the US Army, victor of Mexican War
 Mary Todd Lincoln – First lady
 Robert Lincoln – Lincoln’s son
 *Widow Spriggs – Lincoln’s DC landlady in the 1840s
 James Buchanan – Lame duck 15th president
 *William Dodge – NY merchant
 Mike – porter at Willard’s Hotel
 *Stephen Douglas – Northern Democratic presidential candidate, defeated by Lincoln
 *John Breckinridge – Southern Democratic presidential candidate, defeated by Lincoln
 *John Tyler – former president
 *Zachary Taylor – former president
 Salmon P. Chase – Abolitionist, Senator from OH, Lincoln’s Treasury Secretary
 *Edward Bates – Whig politician
 Gideon Welles – Democrat, Lincoln’s Secretary of the Navy
 *Thurlow Weed – Publisher of the Albany Evening Journal

Ch 2

 David Herold – Pharmacy clerk, Washington Wild Boy, former brothel handyman
 Annie Surrat – David’s friend
 Mrs. Surrat – Annie’s mother, owner of a Maryland truck farm
 John Surrat – owner of a Maryland truck farm, dying
 John Surrat – Son of Mr. and Mrs. Surrat, catholic, studying for priesthood
 Isaac Surrat – Son of Mr. and Mrs. Surrat, engineer
 Mrs. Herold – David’s mother, furniture store proprietress
 *Jefferson Davis – president of confederacy
 Sarah “Sal” Austin – Madam
 Julia – Madam

Ch 3

 *James Polk – Former president when Lincoln was in congress
 Edward McManus – White House doorkeeper, “Old Edward”
 Harriet Lane – President Buchanan’s niece, de facto first lady
 *the Other Edward – President Buchanan’s waiting room manager
 Edwin Stanton – Buchanan’s Attorney General, later special counsel to Secretary of War; later Lincoln’s second Secretary of War
 *Mr Floyd – Secretary of War under Buchanan
 *Robert E Lee – Army colonel
 *Major Anderson – Union officer in charge of Ft Sumter

Ch 4

 John Hay – Lincoln’s secretary, appointed to position at Treasury Dept
 John George Nicolay – Lincoln’s secretary
 *William Herndon – Lincoln’s law partner in Springfield
 Tad Lincoln – Lincoln’s son (7)
 Willie Lincoln – Lincoln’s son (10)
 Charles Sumner – Senator from MA, abolitionist
 Sarah Helen Whitman – Providence poet, professor, one-time fiancée of EA Poe
 *Henry Clay – Senator from KY
 *William Cullen Bryant – Editor of New York Evening Post
 *Horace Greeley – New York editor
 Henry Adams – Harvard student, friend of Robert Lincoln, son of Charles Francis Adams

Ch 5

 *Simon Cameron – Lincoln’s first Secretary of War
 The Blairs – Political family from MD
 *John Brown – Abolitionist, hanged
 *Reverend Garrison – Abolitionist, imprisoned
 Kate Chase – Chase’s daughter (20) and de facto hostess at his house
 *Nettie Chase – Chase’s daughter (13)
 *Alexander Stephens – Congressman from VA, VP of Confederacy
 *Philip Barton Key – Murder victim, son of Francis Scott Key
 *Dan Sickles – Congressman from NY, acquitted murderer of Key in a fit of jealous rage
 Elizabeth Grimsley – Lincoln’s cousin, “Cousin Lizzie”
 *Eddie Lincoln – Lincoln’s son, deceased at 3 years of age

Ch 7

 Henry D. Cooke – Editor of Ohio State Journal, friend of Chase
 Jay Cooke – Wealthy Philadelphia financier
 *Philander Chase – Episcopalian bishop in Ohio
 *Miss Haines – Finishing schoolmistress
 Francis Preston Blair – The “Old Gentleman,” former editor of the Congressional Globe, friend of Jackson, kingmaker
 Frank Blair – Blair’s son, Republican congressman from Missouri
 Montgomery Blair – Blair’s son, lawyer in Maryland, Lincoln’s Postmaster General

Ch 8

 Scipione Grillo – Musician, restaurateur
 Mr. Scala – Conductor of the Marine Band
 William S. Thompson – Pharmacist, employer of David Herold
 Elvira – Cleaning woman at pharmacy
 *Dr Hardinge – Jefferson Davis’s physician
 *Mr Dayton – Whig politician
 Elmer E. Ellsworth – Drillmaster of the Zouaves
 Hannibal Hamlin – Lincoln’s VP, Senator from Maine
 *Edwin Forest – Actor
 Roger B. Taney – Chief Justice

Ch 9

 James Gordon Bennett – Publisher of New York Herald
 Chester – Butler at Sal Austin’s brothel
 Marie-Jeanne – Prostitute

Ch 10

 *John Bright – British MP
 *William Gladstone – British PM
 Elizabeth Keckley – Dressmaker to Mrs. Lincoln
 *Nelson – Todd family butler in KY
 *Mammy Sally – Todd family nanny in KY
 *Judge Turner – Lexington judge
 *Caroline Turner – Cruel wife of Judge Tuner, slave murderer
 *Richard – Turner slave, murderer of Caroline in self defense

Ch 11

 Empress Eugenie – Last empress of France, wife of Napoleon III
 *Calvin Fairbanks – Abolitionist minister with slave buyback scheme
 *Eliza – Slave bought at auction by Fairbanks, freed in KY
 *Lord Lyons – British minister to USA
 *Benjamin Disraeli – British Chancellor of the Exchequer
 Caleb B. Smith – Lincoln’s Secretary of the Interior, from KY, conservative
 *Captain Fox – Union naval officer
 Frederick Seward – Seward’s son, Undersecretary of State

Ch 12

 General Beauregard – Confederate general in SC
 *Mrs. Alexander – Member of founding family of Alexandria, VA
 *Doctor Breckinridge – Former VP’s uncle, unionist in KY
 *Governor Pickens – Governor of SC
 Senator Hale – Senator from NH

Ch 13

 Mr. Mayberry – Alexandria tavernkeeper, Confederate information monger
 Mr. Brown – Mayor of Baltimore
 *Benjamin Butler – Union general, commander of 8th Massachusetts Regiment, commander at Ft Monroe
 Henry Wikoff – Diplomat, memoirist, the “Chevalier,” friend of Sickles and Mrs. Lincoln
 *Queen Isabella – Queen of Spain
 Napoleon III – Emperor of France
 *Joseph Bonaparte – Napoleon’s uncle
 *Lord Palmerston – British diplomat and intelligence agent
 Charles Schermerhorn Schuyler – Diplomat, author
 *Victor Hugo – French novelist
 *Larmatine – French politician
 *The Misses Mentelle – Sisters, mistresses of French academy in Lexington
 Emilie Helm – Mrs. Lincoln’s half sister, “Little Sister”
 Ben Hardin Helm – Mrs. Lincoln’s brother in law, West Pointer

Ch 15

 William Sprague – Governor of RI, the “boy governor”
 Ambrose Burnside – West Point grad, Union commander, former RR man with Lincoln
 Zach Chandler – Senator from MI
 Senator Hale – Senator from NH
 Bessie Hale – Senator Hale’s daughter, inamorata of John Wilkes Booth
 *Thaddeus Stevens – Congressman from PA, chair of Ways and Means Committee
 M. Mercier – French minister to US
 Baron Gerolt – Prussian minister to US
 *Governor Hardin – Governor of Kentucky
 Mr. Watt – White House groundsman
 *William S. Wood – Commissioner of Public Buildings

Ch 16

 *Mrs Cuthbert – White House housekeeper
 Mr Anderson – Virginia innkeeper, Marshall House

Ch 17

 Mr Stevens – President of New York Bank of Commerce
 Mr Vail – Cashier of New York Bank of Commerce
 Morris Ketchum – Independent banker
 William Henry Aspenwall – Independent banker
 *Mr Merryman – Prisoner of US Army in Baltimore, held without charge
 *General Cadwalder – Union leader at Ft McHenry

Ch 18

 Irvin McDowell – General, Union Army of the Potomac
 *General Mansfield – Union commander
 *General McClellan – Union commander
 *Charles Francis Adams – US minister to England
 John Bigelow – Former editor of NY Evening Post, US minister to France
 *General Johnston – Confederate commander at Harper’s Ferry
 *General Bates – Union commander
 *General Fremont – Union commander in West
 John Forney – Clerk of the Senate, editor of Washington Chronicle
 *William O. Stoddard – Mrs. Lincoln’s aide

Ch 19

 William Fessenden – Senator from ME, later Secretary of Treasury after Chase
 LymanTrumbull – Senator from IL
 William Howard Russell – Times of London war correspondent
 William Sanford – Union captain, General McClellan’s aide
 *Julia Trumbull – Senator Trumbull’s wife, former friend of Mrs Lincoln
 *James Gordon Bennett, Jr. – Bennett’s son

Ch 20

 Rose Greenhow – Great-niece of Dolly Madison, Aunt of Stephen Douglas, confederate informant
 Bettie Duvall – Confederate informant
 *Reverend Doctor James Smith – Presbyterian minister from Springfield, friend of Mrs Lincoln, proposed as US minister to Scotland
 Benjamin Wade – Senator from OH, radical abolitionist
 James Grimes – Senator from IA
 Henry Wilson – Senator from MA
 *George Washington – Headwaiter at Willard’s Hotel

Part 2 - Ch 1

 *Major French – Commissioner of Public Buildings
 *Alexander T. Stewart – NY department store magnate
 *Edward D. Baker – Former IL senator and friend of Lincoln
 *General Hunter – Union commander
 *General Henry E. Halleck – Union commander in West; protégé of Scott
 *Senator Johnson – Senator from TN, Unionist
 *Clausewitz – German political theorist
 *Judge Davis – Friend of Lincoln, appointed to the Supreme Court
 Baron Stueckl – Russian minister to US

Ch 2

 *Prince Albert – Husband of Queen Victoria
 Count of Paris – Prince, rightful king of France, visiting US
 Duke of Chartres – the prince’s brother
 Prince of Joinville – The prince’s uncle
 Emily Glendenning – Actress
 John T. Ford – Theater owner
 Chicken Henderson – Poultry Merchant, informant
 Zadoc Jenkins – Mrs. Surrat’s brother
 *Father Jenkins – President of St Charles College in MD
 Susan Henderson – Family friend of Chase
 Baron Schleiden – Hanseatic minister to US
 *Joseph Holt – Pro Union Democrat in Buchanan’s cabinet

Ch 3

 Mr. Wormley – Washington restaurateur
 *Joshua Speed – Lincoln’s old friend from IL
 *Mr. Hill – Store owner in IL, Lincoln’s old friend
 Dr. Prettyman – Brothel physician
 *Dr. Drake – Physician from Cincinnati
 *Mr. Chatterton – Herndon’s friend, office-seeker
 *General Buell – Union officer in west
 *General Franklin – Union officer
 F. E. Spinner – US Treasurer
 Mr. Meigs – Union quartermaster general

Ch 4

 *Mrs. Watt – John Watt’s wife, on the White House payroll as steward
 *Mr. Waterman – Rich man from NY
 John Hickman – Congressman from PA, abolitionist, Chair of joint congressional commission on the conduct of the war
 Mrs. Crittendon – Washington society lady
 Mrs. Welles – Wife of Congressman Welles
 *Ulysses S. Grant – Brigadier General from IL
 *Elizabeth Edwards – Mrs. Lincoln’s sister

Ch 5

 General Viele – Union commander
 Commodore Goldsborough – Union naval officer
 John E. Wool – Union commander at Ft Monroe
 *General Hooker – Union commander at Williamsburg

Ch 6

 *Joe Johnston – Confederate commander at Richmond
 *Therena Bates – Nicolay’s fiancée       
 *Hole-in-the-Day – Native American leader
 General Pope – Union commander from IL; “Old Brains”
 James A. Garfield – Union general from OH, major-general at Chickamauga, later congressman
 *Lucretia Garfield – General Garfield’s wife
 *Mrs Laury – Spiritualist medium

Ch 7

 Azadia – prostitute
 E. M. Thomas – African American leader
 *Frederick Douglass – African American leader
 *Princess Alice – Daughter of Queen Victoria
 *Grand Duke of Hesse – Princess Alice’s betrothed
 *Adele Douglas – Widow of Stephen Douglas
 Harris Hoyt – Texas cotton merchant and would-be smuggler; colleague of Sprague
 *Mr Thayer – Potential governor of East Florida
 *Governor Dayton – Corrupt governor of OH
 *Fred Ives – RI journalist and speechwriter for Sprague
 *Byron Sprague – Industrialist, Sprague’s cousin
 Charles E Prescott – Shipfitter

Ch 8

 *James Trimble – White House steward
 Jimmy – White House maintenance man
 *Anna Miles – Herdon’s bride
 *James Stanton – Stanton’s infant son
 * Mr. Wadsworth – Republican candidate for Governor of NY
 *Horatio Seymore – Democratic Governor of NY
 *Andrew Johnson – Republican Governor of TN
 *William S. Rosenkrans – Union commander

Ch 9

 Charles Eames – Publisher, diplomat
 Mrs. Eames – Eames’s wife, fashionable hostess
 Baroness Gerolt – Gerolt’s wife
 Carlotta Gerolt – Gerolt’s daughter
 *M. Mercier – French diplomat
 *Otto von Bismarck – Prussian chancellor
 *Manton Marble – Editor of the New York World
 Mr. Sullivan – Saloon keeper, Confederate spy
 *”The Colonel” – Head of Confederate intelligence in DC
 *Artemus Ward – Comic author
 *Preston King – Republican Senator from NY
 *Laurence Stern – English author
 *Jacob Collamer – Senator from VT

Ch 10

 Mrs. Stanton – Stanton’s wife
 *Mrs Caleb Smith – Smith’s wife
 *John Usher – Appointed Secretary of the Interior, from IN
 *Sam Todd – Mrs. Lincoln’s half brother, killed at Shiloh
 *Aleck Todd – Mrs. Lincoln’s half brother, killed at Baton Rouge, “Little Aleck”
 *Clement C. Valladigham – Congressman from OH, Democratic “copperhead”
 William O’Connor – Treasury Department clerk, novelist
 *Ralph Waldo Emerson – Poet
 Walt Whitman – Poet, appointment seeker
 *Mr. Taylor – NY saloonkeeper
 *George Whitman – Whitman’s brother, Union soldier
 *Mrs. Whitman – Whitman’s mother

Ch 11

 Corporal Stone – Confederate soldier, Mrs. Lincoln’s friend from KY
 *John Todd – Mrs. Lincoln’s cousin, Confederate general
 *John Hunt Morgan – Confederate commander from KY
 *Mrs. Todd – Mrs. Lincoln’s stepmother
 *Charles Hay – Hay’s brother
 *Fanny Sprague – Sprague’s mother, New England matriarch
 Roscoe Conkling – Congressman from NY

Ch 12

 *George Meade – Union general
 *Governor Curtin – Governor of PA
 *The Biddles – Patrician family of PA
 *Mrs. Pomroy – Mrs. Lincoln’s nurse
 Captain Rewalt – Union physician from PA
 *Mr. Chandler – War Department telegraph operator
 *Miss Hooper – Daughter of Georgetown merchant
 *P.T. Barnum – Impresario
 *Tom Thumb – Entertainer
 *Mrs. Thumb – Entertainer
 Admiral Porter – Union naval commander
 *Mrs. Hanks – Lincoln’s mother
 *John C. Calhoun – Slavery advocate
 *Senator Morgan – Senator from NY
 Samuel J. Tilden – Former governor of NY
 *Martin Van Buren – Former president
 *Archbishop Hughes – Catholic archbishop of NY

Part 3 - Ch 1

 *Mr. Grover – Theater owner
 *E. L. Davenport – Actor
 *J. W. Wallack – Actor
 *Miss Cushman – Actor
 Edward Spangler – Stagehand
 *Edwin Forrest – Actor
 *Junius Brutus Booth – Actor, father of John Wilkes Booth
 *Edwin Booth – Actor, brother of John Wilkes Booth
 *J.B. Booth, Jr. – Theater manager
 *Mrs. Siddons – Actor
 *Senator Pomeroy – Senator from KS, Chase’s campaign manager
 Whitelaw Reid – Journalist from Cincinnati Gazette
 Ella Turner – John Wilkes Booth’s date
 *F. W. Hurtt – Henry Cooke’s partner, owner of Ohio State Journal
 *Isaac J. Allen – Editor and partner in Ohio State Journal
 Hiram Barney – Customs collector, Port of New York
 General Magruder – Union commander in Galveston
 *William Wheatley – Actor

Ch 2

 Ira Harris – Senator from NY
 *Teresa Sickles – Sickles’s wife
 *Katherine Helm – Emilie’s daughter

Ch 3

 *Schuyler Colfax – Speaker of the House
 *James G. Blaine – Congressman from ME, newspaper editor
 *James A. Garfield – Congressman, Union major-general at Chickamauga
 John T. Trowbridge – Chase’s biographer
 *Senator Sherman – Senator and pamphleteer
 *Mr. Winchell – NY journalist and pamphleteer
 *Isaac Newton – Director of Agriculture Bureau
 *Simeon Draper – Collector, Port of New York
 Fred Grant – General Grant’s son
 *William Mortimer – Government appointee, friend of Mrs. Lincoln
 *William Tecumseh Sherman – Union general

Ch 4

 *James S. Wadsworth – Union general, friend of Lincoln
 *Governor Andrew – Governor of NY
 *Mr. Dickinson – NY politician
 *Emperor Maximillian – French ruler in Mexico
 Julia Ward Howe – Poet
 *John Burrows – Treasury Department clerk, literary man
 Maunsell B. Field – Chase’s aide and protégé
 *Baron Renfrew – Prince of Wales
 *Jenny Lind – Swedish soprano
 *John C. Cisco – Treasurer of NY
 *Senator Morgan – Senator from NY
 *Senator Chase – Senator from NY
 *Dave Tod – Governor of OH, nominated by Lincoln as Secretary of the Treasury
 *General Schenk – Union commander
 Mr. Hooper – Congressman, friend of Chase
 Senator Conness – Senator
 Louis XVI – King of France
 M. Necker – Louis’ finance minister

Ch 5

 *Jubal Early – Confederate general at Washington
 *Lew Wallace – Union general at Monocacy Junction
 Horatio Wright – Union major general at Washington
 *Abram Wakeman – Candidate for Surveyor of NY
 *A.T. Stewart – NY merchant
 Oliver Wendell Holmes, Jr. – Union lieutenant colonel, son of the poet

Ch 6

 *Philip Sheridan – Union general
 *Admiral Farragut – Union naval commander
 Mr. Nichols – Union soldier in Lincoln’s guard
 Mr. Raymond – Publisher of the New York Times

Ch 7

 *Petroleum V. Nasby – Comic author
 John A. Dix – Union commander of the Department of the East
 *William Dennison – Postmaster General after Blair
 Major Eckert – Union officer
 Noah Brooks – Journalist from CA, Lincoln’s second term secretary

Ch 8

 *Mr. Walsh – Druggist in Navy Yard, Washington
 *Mr. Lloyd – The Surrat’s tenant in MD
 Mr. and Mrs. Holohan – Surrat’s boarders in Washington
 *James Speed – Springfield attorney, brother of Joshua Speed, nominated for Attorney General
 *Charles S. Prescott – Smuggler
 William H. Reynolds – Smuggler

Ch 9

 Alexander H. Stevens – Confederate Vice President
 John A. Campbell – Former Supreme Court Justice, Confederate negotiator
 R.M.T. Hunter – Former Senator, Confederate negotiator
 Lewis Payne – Conspirator, aka Lewis Powell of Mosby’s Raiders, “The Terrible Lew”
 George Atzerodt – Boatman, smuggler, conspirator
 *Avonia Jones – Actress
 Major French – Director of Lincoln’s second inauguration
 *Hugh M. McCulloch – Secretary of Treasury after Fessenden

Ch 10

 Mr. Crook – Tad Lincoln’s bodyguard
 James Ord – Commanding General, Union Army of the James
 Mrs. Griffiths – Wife of Union general
 Mrs. Ord – Ord’s wife
 Major Seward – Seward’ nephew
 General Weitzer – Union officer at Richmond

Ch 11

 Laura Keene – Comic actress
 Miss Harris – Daughter of Senator Harris
 Major Rathbone – Miss Harris’s fiancé
 Isaac – Lincoln’s friend from Chicago
 Tom Pendel – White House doorkeeper
 Emma Schuyler – Daughter of Charles Schuyler, Princess d’Agrigent
 *Prince d’Agrigent – French aristocrat, Emma’s estranged husband

Critical and Public Reception 

The critical reception of the book has been widely varied. With a rating of 4.21/5 stars from 8,256 ratings on Goodreads, the wider public mostly enjoyed the narrative as a work of historical fiction. Common themes among reviewers were the novel’s entertaining style and accessibility.

The Washington Post also wrote a positive review at the time of publication, praising Vidal’s well practiced craftsmanship in skilfully creating a satisfying read. This positive praise was reflected in The New York Review of Books.

The book was also subject to critical backlash, primarily from academic historians.
Roy P. Basler contends that much of Lincoln’s life never happened as told by Vidal. This historical inaccuracy extends to the character’s personalities and physical attributes.  Significantly, Vidal faced intense criticism for his depiction of a racist Lincoln, and a syphilitic deranged Mary Todd Lincoln. Despite the novel’s genre of historical narrative, the purported distortion in facts was seen as potentially damaging to the public.

John Alvis published a review of the novel in The Claremont Review of Books.  According to Alvis, the book is ‘disappointing for being at bottom inadequate.’  It was contended that Vidal’s novel succumbed to melodrama, historical inaccuracy and sensationalism. The Dean of Lincoln Scholars Richard N. Current took great exception to his novel, starting a running feud with Vidal in the pages of The New York Review of Books.

However, within academic quarters there was also positive reception. Harold Bloom, the Sterling Professor of Humanities at Yale University, published a review in the New York Review of Books, where he called the book ‘superb’ and ‘grand entertainment.’ 
Vidal was also described as an impressive writer who has helped shape popular consciousness and offer an alternative view on the dominant understanding of American society and history.

Awards 

In 1985 Vidal was awarded the Benjamin Barondess Award for the novel. The recipient of the award receives a sculpture of Abraham Lincoln, specifically a bust. It is presented annually "to any person or institution and for any contribution to the greater appreciation of the life and works of Abraham Lincoln as decided upon by the award committee.” 

It also was placed on the Torchlight List that recognises 200 works that equip people with concepts to help them comprehend the complexities of the modern world. The list is definitive and was devised by Jim Flynn, a professor who lecturers at the University of Otago.

It was also placed on the New York Times Best Seller List in 1984.

Adaptation
Lincoln, a made-for-TV film based on the novel, first aired in 1988 in two parts on March 27 and March 28. It stars Sam Waterston as Lincoln and Mary Tyler Moore as Mary Todd Lincoln.

It differed from the book by focussing less on the personal struggle and growth of Lincoln, but more on the war itself. Both the director and lead actress were awarded Emmys for their work on the miniseries.

Writing and Publication
The book was published in 1984 by Penguin Random House LLC. Vidal claimed that the book was researched and written over a period of 5 years. It largely draws from primary sources, including newspapers, diaries, and letters of the time. Like Vidal's other historical fiction works, such as Washington D.C. and Burr: A Novel, Vidal includes an extraordinary amount of detail, and attempts to follow the documented record closely.

Vidal’s Lincoln was considered a commercial success. It was on The New York Times’ best-seller chart for 22 weeks and sold over 250 000 hard cover copies.
The Afterword of the novel thanks Professor David Herbert Donald of Harvard’s History Department for fact checking the manuscript.

References

1984 American novels
Novels by Gore Vidal
Novels set during the American Civil War
Fictional depictions of Abraham Lincoln in literature
Random House books
Cultural depictions of John Wilkes Booth
American novels adapted into films
American historical novels
American novels adapted into television shows
American bildungsromans